Victrix is a genus of moths in the family Noctuidae described by Otto Staudinger in 1879. It may be synonymous with the genus Moureia.

Species
Subgenus Victrix
Victrix karsiana Staudinger, 1879 Armenia, north-eastern Turkey, Asia Minor
Victrix gracilis (Wagner, 1931) Turkey
Victrix agenjoi (Fernández, 1931) Spain
Victrix artaxias Varga & Ronkay, 1989 Armenia
Victrix pinkeri Hacker & Lödl, 1989
Victrix marmorata (Warren, 1914) Qinghai
Subgenus Rasihia
Victrix acronictoides Han & Kononenko, 2017 Yunnan
Victrix boursini (Draudt, 1936) Turkey
Victrix chloroxantha (Boursin, 1957) Afghanistan
Victrix commixta (Warren, 1909) northern Afghanistan
Victrix confucii (Alphéraky, 1892) Tibet
Victrix conspersa (Christoph, 1893) Turkmenistan
Victrix diadela (Hampson, 1908) western Turkestan
Victrix duelduelica (Osthelder, 1932) Turkey
Victrix gracilior (Draudt, 1950)
Victrix hackeri Varga & Ronkay, 1991
Victrix illustris Varga & Ronkay, 1991 Afghanistan
Victrix klapperichi Hacker, 2001
Victrix lichenodes Boursin, 1969 Afghanistan
Victrix macrosema (Boursin, 1957) northern Iran
Victrix marginelota (Joannis, 1888) Syria, Transcaspia
Victrix nanata (Draudt, 1950) Yunnan
Victrix octogesima (Boursin, 1960) Afghanistan
Victrix precisa (Warren, 1909) Morocco, Algeria
Victrix sassanica Wiltshire, 1961 Iran
Victrix superior (Draudt, 1950) Yunnan
Victrix tabora (Staudinger, [1892]) Syria, Turkey
Victrix tristis (Rungs, 1945) western Sahara
Subgenus Chytobrya
Victrix albida (Draudt, 1950) Sichuan
Victrix bryophiloides (Draudt, 1950) Yunnan
Victrix fraudatrix (Draudt, 1950) Sichuan, Yunnan
Victrix perlopsis (Draudt, 1950) Sichuan
Subgenus Poliobrya
Victrix patula (Püngeler, 1906) eastern Turkestan, Xinjiang
Victrix umovii (Eversmann, 1846) Sweden, Finland, Estonia, Latvia, Lithuania, Poland, Ukraine, Moldova, western Kazakhstan, Urals, south-western Siberia
Victrix svetlanae Koshkin & Pekarsky, 2020 south-eastern Siberia
Victrix fabiani Varga & Ronkay, 1989 Mongolia
Victrix frigidalis Varga & Ronkay, 1991
Victrix akbet Volynkin, Titov & Cernila, 2019 north-easter Kazakhstan
Subgenus Micromima Matov, Fibiger & Ronkay, 2009
Victrix bogdoana Matov, Fibiger & Ronkay, 2009
Victrix bioculalis (Caradja, 1934) Mongolia, northern China
Victrix sinensis Han, Kononenko & Behounek, 2011 Fujian, Guangdong, Zhejiang, Shaanxi
Victrix tripuncta (Draudt, 1950) Shanxi

References

Acronictinae